William Hendricks Yohn Jr. (born November 20, 1935) is an inactive Senior United States district judge of the United States District Court for the Eastern District of Pennsylvania.

Education and career

Born in 1935 in Pottstown, Pennsylvania, Yohn graduated from Princeton University with a Bachelor of Arts degree in 1957 and received his Juris Doctor from the Yale Law School in 1960. He also attended the National Judicial College in Reno, Nevada. Yohn served in the United States Marine Corps from 1960 to 1961, and continued in the reserves until 1965. He was in private practice in Pottstown from 1961 to 1981. During that time, Yohn served as an assistant district attorney (1962–1965) and as a member of the Pennsylvania House of Representatives from 1968 to 1980. In 1981 he was elected as a judge on the court of common pleas for Montgomery County, a position he held until 1991.

Federal judicial service

Yohn was nominated by President George H. W. Bush on June 14, 1991, to a seat on the United States District Court for the Eastern District of Pennsylvania vacated by Judge John P. Fullam. He was confirmed by the United States Senate on September 12, 1991, and received commission on September 16, 1991. He assumed senior status on November 20, 2003.

Vincent Fumo case

Yohn was assigned to be the Judge during the Vincent Fumo corruption trial in Philadelphia Federal Court in September 2008. On September 14, 2008, The Philadelphia Inquirer announced that Yohn had been hospitalized. He had been suffering from a cough and had complained in court last week about viruslike symptoms. As of September 30, 2008, Yohn was replaced as the judge in the Fumo case.

References

External links

1935 births
Living people
Princeton University alumni
Yale Law School alumni
Members of the Pennsylvania House of Representatives
United States Marine Corps officers
Judges of the United States District Court for the Eastern District of Pennsylvania
United States district court judges appointed by George H. W. Bush
20th-century American judges
21st-century American judges